The Ferguson House is a historic house at 902 East 4th Street in Pine Bluff, Arkansas.  It is a two-story wood-frame structure, with a hip roof and clapboard siding.  It has a variety of projecting gable sections, dormers, and porches typical of the Queen Anne style.  The interior features high-quality woodwork, including fireplace mantels, and a particularly ornate main staircase.  It was built in 1896 by Calvin Ferguson, a local builder, for his family.

The house was listed on the National Register of Historic Places in 1978.

See also
National Register of Historic Places listings in Jefferson County, Arkansas

References

Houses completed in 1896
Houses in Pine Bluff, Arkansas
Houses on the National Register of Historic Places in Arkansas
National Register of Historic Places in Pine Bluff, Arkansas
Queen Anne architecture in Arkansas